The Grand Opera House was an opera house and concert hall located in Toronto, Ontario, Canada.

History
Opened in 1874 on Adelaide Street West, west of Yonge Street, the Grand Opera House was Toronto's premier concert hall during the late 19th century. Designed in the Second Empire style with 1750 seats, the hall was the first in the city to feature gaslights that could all be switched on or off simultaneously with one electric switch. The Grand Opera House's stage hosted some of the era's best-known performers, including actors Maurice Barrymore, Sarah Bernhardt and Sir Henry Irving, soprano Emma Albani, as well as Italian baritones Giuseppe Del Puente and Antonio Galassi.  Visiting lecturers included Oscar Wilde. During its initial years, the Grand Opera House was managed by Charlotte Morrison, a former actress, and the guiding force at that time behind Toronto's opera and theatre scenes. Morrison has been described as the "Ed Mirvish of her time".

The Grand Opera House suffered a number of fires, including a major blaze in 1879 that killed a stage-carpenter, as well as his wife and infant daughter. During the late-1890s, the Grand Opera House had its own press agent, W. A. Hewitt. Although the hall was restored and reopened after each fire, it slowly fell into neglect with the arrival of the vaudeville age in the 1900s, which brought with it newer and more modern vaudeville theatres to Toronto, most notably the Loews and Winter Garden Theatres on Yonge Street.

In 1919, the Grand Opera House became embroiled in an infamous and widely reported criminal investigation. On December 2, the Grand Opera House's owner at the time, Ambrose Small, deposited a cheque for a million dollars in a nearby bank, and went missing later that day. Before his disappearance, Small already had a reputation in Edwardian era Toronto as a gambler, and booked less reputable, more titillating shows to his string of theatres, including the Grand Opera House. The newspapers published every known detail of the police investigation into his disappearance, and soon it was revealed that Small had kept a secret sex room at the Grand Opera House, where he entertained numerous mistresses.

The concert hall never recovered from the fires, the neglect and the scandal, and it was unceremoniously demolished in 1927. The site of the former Grand Opera House is now occupied by the 68-storey Scotia Plaza in Toronto's Financial District.  The sole remaining physical legacy of the concert hall is a small lane running south from Adelaide Street West, named "Grand Opera Lane".

See also

 Four Seasons Centre for the Performing Arts

References

External links
 The Disappearance of Ambrose Small by Haunted Hamilton''

Concert halls in Canada
Opera houses in Canada
Music venues in Toronto
Theatres in Toronto
1927 fires in North America
Demolished buildings and structures in Toronto
Second Empire architecture in Canada
Music venues completed in 1874
Burned buildings and structures in Canada
Buildings and structures demolished in 1927
1874 establishments in Ontario
Former music venues in Canada
Theatres completed in 1874